Success is a 1991 German drama film  based on the eponymous novel by Lion Feuchtwanger. It was entered into the 41st Berlin International Film Festival.

Cast

References

External links

1991 films
1991 drama films
German drama films
1990s German-language films
Films set in the 1920s
Films set in Munich
Films based on German novels
1990s German films